Yaroslav Tkach (born 31 October 2001) is a Ukrainian speed climber. He is 2022 World Games bronze medalist.

He competed in the 2018 Summer Youth Olympics in Buenos Aires, Argentina. There he was 11th (out of 21 competitors) in the boys' combined competition.

Tkach debuted at the senior level in 2018 when he participated at the 2018 World Championships. He finished 5th at the 2020 European Championships. In the 2021 season, Tkach finished 10th in men's World Cup in the category speed. He finished 10th in the combined classification at the 2021 World Championships.

References

External links 
 Tkach's profile at the IFSC Official Webpage
 Tkach's Instagram profile

2001 births
People from Kremenchuk
Ukrainian rock climbers
Living people
World Games bronze medalists
Competitors at the 2022 World Games
Sport climbers at the 2018 Summer Youth Olympics
21st-century Ukrainian people